The Museum of Design, Zürich (German: Museum für Gestaltung Zürich) is a museum for industrial design, visual communication, architecture, and craft in Zurich, Switzerland.

Overview 
The museum is part of the Department of Cultural Analysis of the Zurich University of the Arts (ZHdK). The museum's four extensive collections (Poster, Graphics, Design and Applied Art) are of international importance.

The Museum of Design is located in Zürich's Kreis 5, close to Zürich Hauptbahnhof. Parts of its collections are housed opposite the museum's main building on Limmatstrasse (the Plakatraum, or Poster Collection), and in a commercial building on Förrlibuckstrasse (the Design Collection and Graphics Collection). Until January 2017, the museum also operated the Museum Bellerive, located in a former villa on the shores of Lake Zurich. Since 2018, the city operates the Zürcher Architekturzentrum (Zurich Center for Architecture) in the former villa.

History and buildings
Situated in Zurich's former School of Arts and Crafts the Museum of Design's main building contains an exhibition hall, gallery, reception area, cafeteria, shop and the vestibule to the lecture hall. The Museum of Design developed out of the Museum of Arts and Crafts, which was founded in 1875. In 1933, the museum and the School of Arts and Crafts (today known as the Zurich University of the Arts) moved into its present building designed by Adolf Steger and Karl Egender. In its combination of aesthetic and functional qualities, the building exemplifies the Modern Architecture movement in Switzerland. In 1968 the Museum of Design acquired the former home of the textile manufacturer Julian Bloch and moved part of its Applied Art collection into it. Renamed the Museum Bellerive, the building housed the collection of glass, ceramic, wood, metal and textiles until 2017, when the museum was closed. Its collection was moved to a new location at Toni Areal, a building complexed opened in 2014 which is shared with the University of the Arts and the University of Applied Sciences.

Exhibitions

The Museum of Design shows between five and seven temporary exhibitions annually in the hall and the gallery of the main building, small interventions within the museum, and temporary exhibitions at Toni Areal and in the Plakatraum. Most of the exhibitions shown in the Museum of Design are produced in-house and are developed in dialogue with the museum collections or through research projects. Exhibitions loaned from other institutions make up a small part of the exhibition program.

Exhibitions are accompanied by a program of tours, symposia, panel discussions, talks with artists, film and theatre performances and concerts. A specifically tailored educational program is devised for each exhibition.

Collections
The four collections of the Museum of Design emerged from a teaching collection amassed by the Museum of Arts and Crafts.

Poster Collection (Plakatraum)
The Poster Collection comprises 330,000 posters (of which 120,000 have been photographed and indexed) and documents the international history of the poster from its mid-19th-century origins to the present day.

The collection includes political, cultural and commercial posters. For reasons explicable in terms of design history the geographical focal points are Switzerland, Europe, Japan, Cuba, the former Soviet Union and the United States.

Design Collection 
The Design Collection includes 10,000 products and 20,000 examples of packaging produced by famous designers, as well as representative examples of anonymous everyday design. Mass-produced products from the 20th century and the present are collected, with emphasis placed on Swiss design.

Through its permanent loans from the field of product design (an area that has been subsidized by the Swiss Federal Office of Culture since 1989) the Swiss Confederation makes available objects that pertain to the current design discourse. Parallel to the collection of objects, an archive for Swiss Design is being built up that benefits and assists scholarly research in the field. The archive contains concepts, project studies, design drawings, user guides, patent specifications, advertising material and source texts, as well as parts of the archives of design studios, companies and associations.

Graphics Collection 
The Graphics Collection has existed since the museum was founded. It documents the aesthetic and cultural transformation of graphics in everyday life from Gutenberg to the present.

Originally intended as an international collection of examples, the Graphics Collection includes almost all graphic disciplines that were of importance for teaching at the former School of Arts and Crafts. The core was initially formed by drawings, prints and illustrated books, as well as textbooks from the 15th to the 20th century. Press work, East Asian works, artists books, photographs and commercial art were added later.

Today collecting concentrates on advertising and information graphics, fonts, typography and book design. The collection is developed further by acquiring current works by innovative graphic designers, advertising agencies, the legacies of important designers as well as examples of the corporate design of important companies.

Applied Art Collection 

The Applied Art Collection includes over 15,000 pieces. Originally assembled as a study collection by the Museum of Art and Design, the collection contains diverse objects in the areas of glass, ceramics, textiles and furniture spanning the 19th and 20th centuries. In geographical terms, it concentrates on Europe, the US and modern Japan. Its  Jugendstil department contains works by William Morris, Emile Gallé, René Lalique, Hermann Obrist and Henry van de Velde.  It has a collection of marionettes and puppets that includes works by Sophie Taeuber-Arp and Alexandra Exter. The museum's collection of musical instruments is composed of around 200 historic pieces. Its glass department is particularly strong in objects made from 1880 to after 1970 and includes glass designed and/or made by Jaroslava Brychtová and Stanislav Libenský, Pavel Hlava, Eric Höglund, Livio Seguso and Jan Zoritchak. The Studio Glass generation of artists is represented in objects by, among others, Dale Chihuly, Erwin Eisch, Marvin Lipofsky, Harvey Littleton and Mary Shaffer.

Pavillon Le Corbusier 

The Pavillon Le Corbusier will be renovated until spring 2019. From then on, the Museum für Gestaltung will operate the pavilion. A jury of experts unanimously chose the concept in September 2017 since the concept convinced with an "attractive, tailor-made programme for exhibitions and accompanying events". In December 2016, the city parliament had approved operating subsidies of CHF 500,000 per annum for the new sponsorship for the years 2019 to 2022. In addition, the city will be exempted from rent of CHF 220,000 per annum.

Research and services 
The contents of the collections are continuously analyzed and researched in collaboration with the Zurich University of the Arts (ZHdK) as well as other university-level institutions with the aim of contextually positioning them from a present-day viewpoint and opening them up for cross-disciplinary projects. In addition to study, documentation and conservation, other services such as research, specialist evaluations and reproductions are also offered.

Publications 
The Museum of Design produces publications, either self-printed or in collaboration with well-known publishing houses, which function as an important part of the exhibition program. These include thematically organized series such as the "Design Collection" or the "Poster Collection" as well as anthologies of classic design history and current themes, and monographs about pioneers in the fields of theory and practice.

References

External links

 Museum of Design Zürich 
 The Museum's collections online

Buildings and structures completed in 1933
Art museums established in 1878
Art museums and galleries in Switzerland
Museums in Zürich
University museums in Switzerland
Constructivist architecture
Cultural property of national significance in the canton of Zürich
Design museums
1878 establishments in Switzerland
Zurich University of the Arts
20th-century architecture in Switzerland